The Japeri Line is a commuter rail line operated by SuperVia.

History
The line begins in Central do Brasil station and ends in Japeri station, where it's possible to transfer to trains of Paracambi Line.

Due to the lower train fare when compared to intermunicipal buses running similar routes, it is the line with the highest demand, especially in station which connect the Baixada Fluminense with the North Side, the West Side and the Center of the city of Rio de Janeiro. The demand is high between the first five stations of this line and Central do Brasil, representing a significant amount of trips in the system.

On weekdays before 9 PM, all of the Japeri Line trains circulate between Central do Brasil and Deodoro station as express. There are daily departures between Central do Brasil and Nova Iguaçu station during peak hours, so as to offer more comfort in critical hours, as well as one daily departure from Queimados station towards Central do Brasil.

The average headway during peak hours is 6 to 18 minutes.

The route is the longest of all SuperVia lines and the one with the longest acceleration time of the trains between Engenheiro Pedreira and Japeri, with 5 to 7 minutes of acceleration, and reaching speeds above .

The Dom Pedro II-Japeri line is the initial branch of the defunct Center Line of Central do Brasil Railway. The stretch between Japeri and Monte Azul, Minas Gerais is currently operated only for cargo trains.

Stations

See also
 SuperVia

References

External links
 SuperVia official website

Railway lines in Brazil